Alberto Terrero Castillo (born February 10, 1970) is a Dominican former professional baseball catcher. Castillo was born in San Juan de la Maguana, Dominican Republic. He batted and threw right-handed.

In a twelve-season career, Castillo posted a .220 batting average with 12 home runs and 101 RBI in 418 games played. His longest tenure with one team was the New York Mets, who he played with for four seasons.

During his time with the Mets, Castillo helped end one of the longest scoreless opening day games in MLB history. On March 31, 1998, he hit a full-count, two-out, pinch-hit single to right with the bases loaded in the bottom of the 14th inning to help the Mets beat their division rival Philadelphia Phillies 1–0  at Shea Stadium.

Signed by the Washington Nationals on December 13, 2005, Castillo played the 2006 season with the Triple-A New Orleans Zephyrs. He finished his 2006 season with the Zephyrs with a .268 batting average and 30 RBI. Castillo was a catcher for the first Dominican team in the inaugural 2006 World Baseball Classic.

The Boston Red Sox organization signed him to a minor league contract on December 20, 2006, and invited him to participate in the Red Sox' 2007 spring training.

On March 27, 2007, the Red Sox traded him to the Baltimore Orioles for minor league outfielder Cory Keylor.

He was used in the 2007 season by the Orioles to fill in for injured catcher Ramón Hernández twice and was designated for assignment twice after Hernandez's return. Castillo became a minor league free agent after the season. Castillo was the captain for the Dominican Team in the 2007 Caribbean Series.

On February 14, 2008, Castillo signed a minor league contract with the Houston Astros and was invited to spring training. After spending spring training with the Astros, Castillo was demoted on March 24 to the minors and later released. Confusingly, the Orioles signed a pitcher named Alberto Castillo at the beginning of the 2008 season.

On July 3, 2008, Castillo signed with the Camden Riversharks of the Atlantic League. In 2009, he played for the Newark Bears before being traded to the rival Long Island Ducks on July 6.

He is currently the catching instructor of the Dominican Summer League Mets.

References

External links

Baseball Library

1970 births
Living people
Águilas Cibaeñas players
Baltimore Orioles players
Binghamton Mets players
Columbia Mets players
Columbus Clippers players
Dominican Republic baseball coaches
Dominican Republic expatriate baseball players in Canada
Dominican Republic expatriate baseball players in Mexico
Dominican Republic expatriate baseball players in the United States
Fresno Grizzlies players
Gigantes del Cibao players
Gulf Coast Mets players
Kansas City Royals players
Kingsport Mets players

Long Island Ducks players
Major League Baseball catchers
Major League Baseball players from the Dominican Republic
Mexican League baseball catchers
Minor league baseball managers
New Orleans Zephyrs players
New York Mets players
New York Yankees players
Newark Bears players
Norfolk Tides players
Oakland Athletics players
Omaha Royals players
People from San Juan de la Maguana
Pittsfield Mets players
Sacramento River Cats players
San Francisco Giants players
St. Louis Cardinals players
St. Lucie Mets players
Sultanes de Monterrey players
Toronto Blue Jays players
Toros del Este players
Vaqueros Laguna players
World Baseball Classic players of the Dominican Republic
2006 World Baseball Classic players
2009 World Baseball Classic players